"If She Knew What She Wants" is a song written by American singer-songwriter Jules Shear and introduced on his 1985 album The Eternal Return. The Bangles recorded the song for their 1986 album Different Light. That version, a call-and-response rendition with Susanna Hoffs as the main voice, was issued as a single and became a Top 40 hit. A mid-tempo ballad, it is sung from the viewpoint of someone, per songwriter Shear, "who wants to satisfy someone else but doesn't quite know how to do it because the other person is capricious." The song, especially The Bangles' version, is typically described with such adjectives as "bittersweet", "plaintive" and "wistful".

Original version
"If She Knew What She Wants" was introduced in 1985 on Jules Shear's second solo album,The Eternal Return, to critical acclaim. John Piekarski of The Atlanta Constitution lauded the song's "melody [as] dreamy and vivacious yet mellow enough [for] adult contemporary radio [airplay]." An album review by High Fidelity assessed Shear's love songs as "astute [being] equal parts compassion, affectionate wit, and armchair psychoanalysis", exemplified by the lyric "If she knew what she wants I'd be giving it to her" which "condenses a self-help manual for the mates of neurotics into a single piercing line." Shear himself would say that he typically imparted his songs with "some little twist that makes [them] rise above" standard pop music fare, and "It doesn't really have to be too complicated to be a little bit different."

Although passed over as lead single on The Eternal Return in favor of the Cyndi Lauper co-written "Steady" (whose Hot 100 peak was no. 57), "If She Knew What She Wants" was tagged as the potential followup with EMI, who sent promo copies to radio stations in June 1985. When no significant airplay resulted, EMI canceled both the single's commercial release and a tour by Shear to support his album.

The Bangles version

Background
The Bangles recorded "If She Knew What She Wants" for their 1986 album Different Light. Robert Hilburn of the Los Angeles Times would opine that "on... 'If She Knew What She Wants' the Bangles' voices blend with the kind of seductive charm that you swore disappeared the day the Mamas & the Papas called it quits."

The Bangles had spent the autumn of 1984 as the opening act on the Fun Tour by Cyndi Lauper, the singer through whose patronage Jules Shear had first come to the fore, chiefly through Lauper's hit version of Shear's composition "All Through the Night". The Bangles themselves would subsequently assist Shear in the promotion of his The Eternal Return album. When Shear had mimed his single—the Lauper co-written "Steady"—on an American Bandstand episode broadcast on 8 June 1985, The Bangles served as faux-backup band. Shear would also co-write The Bangles' track "I Got Nothing" included on the 1985 The Goonies soundtrack. Mark Jenkins of The Washington Post would opine that "The Bangles wisely didn't second-guess Shear's version of 'If She Knew What She Wants'; their arrangement of that song... echoes his faithfully—except that they sing better." Vicki Peterson of The Bangles has noted that the group did slightly change Shears' arrangement. Lyrically, some first-person clauses in Shear's recording (ex. "I'm crazy for this girl") are third-person in The Bangles' version (cf. "He's crazy for this girl"). The positioning of the bridge also differs—in Shear's recording the bridge (which begins with "Some have a style") follows the verse that starts with "No sense thinking I could rehabilitate her"; in The Bangles' version, the bridge comes before that verse.

Single release and impact

Overview
Similar in style to the Different Light lead single "Manic Monday", "If She Knew What She Wants" was issued as a follow-up single in April 1986 while "Manic Monday" was still cresting (its Hot 100 peak was no. 2). "If She Knew What She Wants" debuted at no. 80 on the Hot 100 dated 10 May 1986, which ranked "Manic Monday" at no. 18. "If She Knew What She Wants" would begin to lose momentum after reaching no. 50 in its third charting week, stalling at no. 29 on the Hot 100 dated 12 July 1986 in the final week of a five-week Top 40 tenure. "If She Knew What She Wants" would spend a total of ten weeks on the Hot 100.

Cash Box said of it that it's an "infectious, gorgeous pop song."

"If She Knew What She Wants" peaked at no. 31 on the UK Singles, which had afforded "Manic Monday" a no. 2 peak. "If She Knew What She Wants" also became a moderate chart success in Australia at no. 31 on the Kent Music Report, and in Canada where it peaked in its 10th week on the RPM 100 Singles chart at no. 29 on 26 July 1986.

A third single release from Different Light—the novelty number "Walk Like an Egyptian"—would solidify The Bangles' popularity as Top 40 hit artists.

Charts

Video and soundtrack usage

The Bangles shot a promotional video for "If She Knew What She Wants" while on tour in the UK the first week of March 1986, and it was this video that aired in the British Isles and Europe. Upon returning the US, the band shot an alternate video for the song's American promotion, produced by Tamar Simon Hoffs, mother of the track's main vocalist Susanna Hoffs, and directed by Dan Perri.

The Bangles version of "If She Knew What She Wants" is featured in the 2006 Tim Allen and Courteney Cox superhero comedy Zoom.

References

External links
 Lyrics of this song at Genius (Jules Shear version)
The Bangles music video (US version) via YouTube
The Bangles music video (UK version) via YouTube
The Bangles extended remix (UK) via YouTube
Jules Shear version via YouTube

1986 singles
The Bangles songs
Songs written by Jules Shear
Columbia Records singles
Song recordings produced by David Kahne
1985 songs
Jules Shear songs